Baroa soricina is a moth of the subfamily Arctiinae. It was described by Snellen in 1879. It is found on Sulawesi.

References

Arctiini
Moths described in 1879